New Belgrade railway station is a railway station in New Belgrade, Belgrade, Serbia. The railroad continues to Tošin Bunar and Zemun in one direction, and Belgrade Centre in the other direction. New Belgrade railway station consists of five railway tracks. It primarily serves New Belgrade, the central business district of Belgrade, and therefore is notably used by commuters from Novi Sad, Inđija and Stara Pazova. Since Belgrade centre railway station has weak connections to the network of public transport, New Belgrade railway station is also used by passenger from some neighbourhoods on the right bank of Sava, especially the ones in Čukarica municipality.

Services 
Srbija voz offers following services:

 Intercity (IC) Belgrade Centre – Novi Sad (non-stop service to Novi Sad, one train per hour from 08:13 to 20:04)
 Regio Express (REx) Belgrade Centre – Novi Sad (five trains per day, usually in peak hours)
 Regio (RE) Belgrade Centre – Novi Sad (two trains in three hours)

Temporarily there are no domestic services to Šid and Mali Zvornik as well as international services to Budapest, Wien, Zagreb and Ljubljana, which called at the station before the commencement of the reconstruction of Belgrade Centre – Novi Sad – Subotica railway and COVID-19 pandemic.

There are also services of line 1 (Batajnica – Ovča) of BG voz as well some trains on lines 2, 3 and 4 (from Zemun to Resnik, Mladenovac and Lazarevac).

See also 
 Serbian Railways
 Beovoz
 BG Voz

References

External links 

Railway stations in Belgrade
railway station